Russell Neil McPherson (18 November 1954) is a mayor of Cambridge, England, from May 2020, and previously during 2009–10. From May 2004 he has been a councillor of the Cambridge City Council. For 10 years he has been a chair for a Labour Party Group and during 4 years for a Civic Affairs committee. He is also a President Ex Officia of Cambridge Aid financial services.

He graduated as a BA of Psychology from the Open University and completed a teaching qualification at the Cambridge Regional College.

Awards
 2012: Queen Elizabeth II Diamond Jubilee Medal for work as a Voluntary Community First Responder at the Ambulance Service
 2017: 10-year award for voluntary service to the Ambulance Service

See also 
List of mayors of Cambridge

References

External links
 Opening of Virtual Strawberry Fair at Cambridge 105 Radio

Mayors of Cambridge
Councillors in Cambridgeshire
Labour Party (UK) mayors
People from Cambridge
1954 births
Living people